Peter Williams (born 14 December 1957) is a former Australian rules footballer who played with Richmond in the Victorian Football League (VFL).

Williams, a Waverley recruit, made seven appearances for Richmond, all in the 1979 VFL season. A ruck-rover, Williams debuted in round six, against North Melbourne. He next played in round 12, the first of six successive games.

References

External links

1957 births
Australian rules footballers from Victoria (Australia)
Richmond Football Club players
Waverley Football Club players
Living people